The fourth USS Franklin was a United States Navy screw frigate. The ship was launched in 1864, partially constructed from parts of the previous . Commissioned in 1867, Franklin, named after Founding Father Benjamin Franklin, served as the flagship of the European Squadron in 1867–1871. The vessel was decommissioned that year. Re-activated in 1873, the vessel joined the North Atlantic Squadron and served until 1877 when the vessel was decommissioned again and used as a receiving ship at Norfolk, Virginia. The vessel remained in this capacity until 1915 when she was stricken and sold.

Service history

The ship was laid down at the Portsmouth Navy Yard in Kittery, Maine, in 1854, and built in part of materials salvaged from the previous . For a time housed over, she was launched on 17 September 1864, commissioned on 3 June 1867 at Boston, Massachusetts. Prior to her launching, Woodbury Gerrish was commissioned to build a figurehead for her. Following decommissioning the figurehead was donated to the U.S. Naval Home in Philadelphia, who then passed it onto The Franklin Institute in 1938.

On 28 June 1867 sailed from New York City as flagship of Admiral David Glasgow Farragut, who assumed command of the European Squadron. Franklins second tour in the European Squadron, beginning on 28 January 1869, was as flagship for Rear Admiral William Radford. She served with the squadron until 30 September 1871 when she sailed for the United States. On 13 November 1871 she was decommissioned at Boston.

Recommissioned on 15 December 1873, Franklin operated in the North Atlantic Squadron. On 11 April 1874, she stood out to sea to join the European Squadron as flagship until 14 September 1876. On 9 January 1876, while Franklin was at Lisbon, Portugal, Ordinary Seaman Edward Maddin and Seaman John Handran jumped overboard and rescued a shipmate from drowning, for which they were later awarded the Medal of Honor. In the aftermath of the Salonika Incident, the US Ambassador, Horace Maynard, requested Franklin sailed to the Aegean Sea to protect US interests and citizens.

Franklin was placed out of commission at Norfolk, Virginia, on 2 March 1877 and recommissioned the same day as receiving ship for Naval Station Norfolk, On 21 October 1907 her cutter, Cutter No. 2, with a launch lashed to the starboard side, was in a collision with a barge under tow by the tow steamer Pioneer at Norfolk resulting in the capsizing of the cutter and launch. The cutter sank and one occupant of the launch drowned. Franklin continued in this service until 14 October 1915, which marked her final decommissioning. She was stricken from the Naval Vessel Register on 26 October 1915 and sold.

See also

 List of steam frigates of the United States Navy
 Bibliography of American Civil War naval history
 Union Navy
 Confederate States Navy

References

External links
Images of USS Franklin

Steam frigates of the United States Navy
1864 ships
Ships built in Kittery, Maine
Ships named for Founding Fathers of the United States
Maritime incidents in 1907